The 2013 Evian Championship was played 12–15 September at the Evian Resort Golf Club in Évian-les-Bains, France. It was the 20th Evian Championship (the first 19 played as the Evian Masters), and the first as a major championship on the LPGA Tour. The inaugural event was televised by Golf Channel and NBC Sports in the United States and Sky Sports in the United Kingdom.

Heavy rain before and during the first day of the tournament forced Thursday's played to be suspended and the scores abandoned. The initial plan was to play the first and second rounds on Friday and Saturday and play the final 36 holes on Sunday. The prediction of more heavy rain on Sunday and several following days forced tournament officials to shorten the event to 54 holes.

Suzann Pettersen won by two strokes over amateur Lydia Ko.

Field
The field for the tournament was set at 120, and most earned exemptions based on past performance on the Ladies European Tour, the LPGA Tour, or with a high ranking in the Women's World Golf Rankings.

There were seven exemption categories for the 2013 Evian Championship.

The top 40 in the Women's World Golf Rankings.
Active Evian Masters Champions.
2013 LPGA Tour winners.
2013 Ladies European Tour (LET) winners.
The top 5 on the LET Order of Merit.
Evian invitations (six).
Remainder of players from the LPGA Tour money list.

Nationalities in the field

Course

Source:

Round summaries

First round
Thursday, 12 September 2013
Friday, 13 September 2013

Thursday's play began after a two-hour rain delay. Play was suspended after less than an hour due to continuing rain. The scores were annulled and play resumed on Friday. The course had received almost  of rain since the previous Saturday. The first round was played on Friday with Mika Miyazato of Japan shooting a 6-under-par 65 to take a one stroke lead over Sandra Gal, Se Ri Pak, and Suzann Pettersen.

Second round
Saturday, 14 September 2013

Mika Miyazato shot a 2-under-par 69 to maintain a one-shot lead over Suzann Pettersen and amateur Lydia Ko. The cut was at 146 (+4) and 77 players made the cut.

Final round
Sunday, 15 September 2013

The event was reduced to 54 holes due to heavy rain.

Source:
(a) = amateur

Scorecard
Final round

Cumulative tournament scores, relative to par
{|class="wikitable" span = 50 style="font-size:85%;
|-
|style="background: Pink;" width=10|
|Birdie
|style="background: PaleGreen;" width=10|
|Bogey
|style="background: Green;" width=10|
|Double bogey
|style="background: Olive;" width=10|
|Triple bogey+
|}

References

External links

Coverage on the Ladies European Tour's official site
Coverage on the LPGA Tour's official site

The Evian Championship
Golf tournaments in France
Evian Championship
Evian Championship
September 2013 sports events in France